The Niewerth Building (also known as Hamling's Tavern) is a historic commercial building located at 124 East Main Street, Delphi, Carroll County, Indiana.

Description and history 
It was built in 1874, and is a two-story, five bay, Italianate style brick building. It measures 30 feet wide and 74 feet deep. The exterior was coated with stucco in the 1930s. The front facade features a limestone nameplate labeled "1874 F. Niewerth", a triangular arched entry, and cameo window.

It was listed on the National Register of Historic Places on May 24, 1984. It is located in the Delphi Courthouse Square Historic District.

References

External links

Commercial buildings on the National Register of Historic Places in Indiana
Italianate architecture in Indiana
Commercial buildings completed in 1874
Buildings and structures in Carroll County, Indiana
National Register of Historic Places in Carroll County, Indiana
Historic district contributing properties in Indiana
1874 establishments in Indiana